is an Italian-Japanese 1996 anime television series based on the fairytale of the same name by Charles Perrault and The Brothers Grimm. It was produced by Tatsunoko Productions and Mondo TV. The series originally aired from April 4 to October 3, 1996, comprising 26 episodes.

Summary
The Story of Cinderella opens as Cinderella's life changes for the worse when her widower father leaves on a business trip. No sooner is he out of sight than Cinderella's stepmother has unceremoniously moved her two own daughters into Cinderella's room, thrown out her things, handed her a servant's dress and put her to brutal harsh menial labor. The series covers Cinderella's trials and tribulations as she tries to adapt to her new life while suffering the abuse of her stepmother and her two stepsisters. All the while, her fairy godmother, Paulette, subtly watches her and tries to influence events to fix Cinderella's life without her noticing. One of her first acts in this is to grant several of the animals of the house the power of speech, thus giving Cinderella companions in her dog Patch, a pair of mice named Chuchu and Bingo, and a bird named Pappy who provide her company as well as help with her chores. The biggest twist in the series is that Cinderella meets her Prince Charming early - except here he's the roguish Prince Charles, who has a habit of sneaking out of the castle and meets Cinderella by accident while disguised as a commoner. The two have a few misunderstandings before becoming friends and start having adventures together. Meanwhile, the villainous Duke Zaral plots against the royal family throughout the story, at times working Cinderella into his plots and machinations. The series eventually culminates in the ball in which the fairy tale ends; but with its own unique twist.

Plot
Cinderella is the only daughter of a rich, widowed duke. Her mother died four years prior to the story, leaving behind only a few keepsakes for Cinderella to remember her by. The duke has remarried, giving Cinderella a new stepmother and two stepsisters.

The story begins when Cinderella’s father leaves on a long business trip. No sooner has he departed, however, than her stepfamily forces her to move to the attic and puts her to work doing all the household chores. Paulette, Cinderella’s fairy godmother, secretly observes this change in circumstances and uses her magic to make Cinderella’s life easier by giving four animals the power of speech: her dog, Patch, two mice, Chuchu and Bingo, and a bird, Pappy. These animals help Cinderella and keep an eye on her well-being for Paulette throughout the series.

One day, Cinderella sneaks into town and meets a pageboy who claims he serves the prince of the Emerald Castle. Cinderella quickly realizes he’s lying and dubs him a fibber. Unknown to her, however, the boy is Prince Charles himself in disguise; he sneaks into town using his page’s identity because he finds his lessons and princely duties boring. Cinderella’s stepmother tries to exploit Cinderella’s connection with the prince’s page in order to marry one of her own daughters to the prince. Though the ploy fails, thanks to her meddling Cinderella eventually forgives Charles for lying to her. The two form a friendship that slowly begins to deepen into romance. While Cinderella grows more used to life as a servant, Charles begins to appreciate the importance of his own duties after witnessing her struggles firsthand.

Meanwhile, Duke Zaral is also trying to marry his daughter off to Prince Charles. Isabel is initially infatuated with Charles, but eventually realizes he does not love her and instead chooses to elope with a childhood friend. 

As Cinderella and Charles go on more adventures together, they stumble across a plot to overthrow the King and Queen. Charles eventually discovers that Zaral is responsible. He succeeds in stopping the coup with Cinderella’s help, but reveals his true identity to her in the process. Cinderella, heartbroken, ends their friendship, assuming that the prince would never marry a servant girl, especially after she repeatedly called him a liar. 

In the aftermath of Zaral’s coup, Charles’s parents decide he is ready to take the throne and throw a ball in his honor, with every girl in the kingdom invited. Cinderella decides to go in order to properly say goodbye, choosing to wear her mother’s dress for the occasion. However, her stepfamily mocks the outfit for being out of style and destroy her invitation before leaving without her. Paulette appears and reveals herself as Cinderella’s fairy godmother. Using her magic, she fixes Cinderella’s dress and invitation, as well as conjuring a carriage for her. However, she warns that the magic will only last until midnight, so Cinderella needs to leave before then.

At the ball, no one recognizes Cinderella. Charles, attracted to Cinderella because he finds her familiar, spends the whole evening with her. Cinderella loses track of time and is forced to rush out just before midnight, losing a shoe in the process.

Soon after the ball, Charles’s page, Alex, begins taking the lost shoe house to house in search of the woman from the ball. Cinderella initially refuses to try the shoe on, but agrees after her animal friends reveal that she has the second shoe. She is brought back to the palace, and she and Charles become engaged. 

On the day of the wedding, Zaral gives Charles poison and kidnaps Cinderella. He drags her to the top of the castle clock tower and attempts to bargain her life for the kingdom. He is interrupted by Charles, who faked his poisoning, and the two have a fierce battle which ends with Zaral falling from the tower to his death. 

With peace restored, Cinderella and Charles finally marry and live happily ever after.

Cast

Maria Kawamura as Cinderella
Masami Kikuchi as Prince Charles
Toshiko Sawada as Cinderella's stepmother
Keiko Konno as Catherine, Cinderella's first stepsister
Akiko Matsukuma as Jeanne, Cinderella's second stepsister
Yuuko Mita as Paulette, the Fairy Godmother
Ken Narita as Alex, Charles' best friend
Tomohiro Tsuboi as Bingo, the male mice
Yayoi Nakazawa as Chuchu, the female mice
Tsutomu Tsuji as Wanda/Patch, the dog
Aki Matsushita as Pappy, the bird
Tamao Hayashi as Misha, the cat
Akemi Okamura as Isabelle, Charles' ex-fiancé
Yutaka Nakano as The King, Charles' father
Atsuko Yuya as The Queen, Charles' mother
Kazuhiro Nakata as Zaral/Zarel, Isabelle's father

Themes

Soundtrack

Cinderella (Original Soundtrack) is consisting of 26 tracks which were used as the background music of the TV Series. The whole album is composed by John Sposito and the lyrics are written by Paola Granatelli. The theme song from the album which is titled as "Cenerentola" was sung by Erica Gaura

Track listing

Episodes

References 

1996 anime television series debuts
NHK original programming
Shōjo manga
Tatsunoko Production
Works based on Cinderella
Anime and manga based on fairy tales
Italian children's animated adventure television series
Italian children's animated fantasy television series
Japanese children's animated adventure television series
Japanese children's animated fantasy television series